Wonju Gymnasium is an arena in Wonju, South Korea. It is the home arena of the Wonju DB Promy of the Korean Basketball League. The complex includes above-ground and basement parking space as well as the team's training facilities and clubhouse, which is connected to the arena via a special underground walkway.

Prior to the opening of the Wonju Gymnasium, Wonju DB Promy had played at the outdated and much-maligned Chiak Gymnasium and did not have its own dedicated training ground and facilities. Its players infamously had to work out at local neighborhood gyms. The lack of funding from the pre-Dongbu Insurance era meant that the Chiak Gymnasium was never renovated to meet modern-day standards despite drawing some of the biggest game-day crowds among the KBL teams. The Wonju municipal government agreed to invest ₩5 billion into the construction of a new purpose-built arena. It opened in time for the 2013–14 season.

Events
In addition to basketball, Wonju Gymnasium has been used for concerts and other large-scale events during the off-season. It hosted the 4th APAN Star Awards and several Road Fighting Championship events.

During the COVID-19 pandemic, the arena doubled as a testing site for local residents.

References

External Links
Wonju Gymnasium — Wonju City Facilities Management Corporation 

Basketball venues in South Korea
Indoor arenas in South Korea
Wonju DB Promy